The Craigieburn Football Club is an Australian rules football club and is located 27 km north of Melbourne in the township of Craigieburn.

History 
After an unsuccessful application in 1970 for entry into the Riddell District Football League for the 1971 season, the club successfully re-applied in 1971 for admission in 1972. The first senior game was against Sunbury in which Craigieburn lost by just 245 points.
It began life as an amateur football club with a 21-match losing streak before winning its first match on 3 May 1973 against Romsey, 12.12 (84) to 9.13 (67).

In 1975 the Riddell District Football League split into two divisions, with Craigieburn being cut into this newly formed Second Division, finished the H/A in fourth position with the Seniors and Reserves reaching the Preliminary Final both being defeated by Wallan whilst the Under 17's going through to the club's first Grand Final.

The club's first Senior premiership was the 1979 Second Division when they defeated Broadford by 47 points.

Promoted to First Division the club was competitive and regularly played finals losing the 1986 Grand Final to Melton.

Craigieburn won their initial First Division premiership in 1993 defeating Darley by 28 points.

Craigieburn Football Club played in the Riddell District Football League from 1972 until the end of the 2000 season.

The club entered the Essendon District Football League in 2001 and won the 2005 B Grade premiership defeating West Coburg 11.14.80 to 10.12.72.

VFL/AFL players 
Adam Pickering – 
Mitch Farmer  –  , 
Jake Carlisle –  ,

Senior Premierships (4) 
 RDFL Second Division
 1979
 RDFL First Division
 1993
 EDFL B Grade
 2005, 2016

Junior Club 
Formed in 1967 by Craigieburn resident Jim McKessy, competed in the Northern Junior Football League.

References 

Essendon District Football League clubs
Australian rules football clubs established in 1970
1970 establishments in Australia
Australian rules football clubs in Melbourne
Sport in the City of Hume